The E3 ubiquitin-protein ligase Hakai (HAKAI) also known as Casitas B-lineage lymphoma-transforming sequence-like protein 1 (CBLL1) is an enzyme that in humans is encoded by the CBLL1 gene. This gene encodes an E3 ubiquitin ligase for the E-cadherin complex and mediates its ubiquitination, endocytosis, and degradation in the lysosomes. The encoded protein contains a RING-finger domain and is also thought to have a role in control of cell proliferation.

Function 
Hakai functions as a RING finger domain-containing E3 ubiquitin ligase for E-cadherin. Hakai mediates E-cadherin ubiquitination and its degradation by proteasomes. "Hakai" means "destruction" in Japanese. Proteosomal degradation of E-cadherin can be regulated by phosphorylation. The Hakai binding site is a part of the E-cadherin cytoplasmic domain that contains several tyrosines. Tyrosine kinases such as Src and Met can phosphorylate E-cadherin and enhance Hakai binding to E-cadherin. Two lysines of the E-cadherin cytoplasmic domain have been shown to be sites for ubiquitination. Hakai also interacts with polypyrimidine tract-binding protein-associated splicing factor.

See also 
CBL (gene); the gene name "CBLL1" comes from "Cbl-like protein 1"

References

External links
 

EC 6.3